On Dark Horses is the fourth solo studio album by American singer-songwriter Emma Ruth Rundle. It was released on September 14, 2018 through Sargent House. Recording sessions took place in March 2018 at La La Land in Louisville, Kentucky. Production was handled by Kevin Ratterman.

Critical reception 

On Dark Horses was met with universal acclaim from music critics. At Metacritic, which assigns a normalized rating out of 100 to reviews from mainstream publications, the album received an average score of 82 based on six reviews.

AllMusic's James Christopher Monger called the album "a far more collaborative affair, and while it still looks inward, it does so with the kind of steely warmth that can only come from somebody who has seen the light at the end of the tunnel as clearly as they've seen the oncoming train". 

Matt Yuyitung of Exclaim! stated: "While Marked For Death felt more cathartic and Some Heavy Ocean felt more plaintive, there's no denying the emotional heft of On Dark Horses. This is another confident step forward by an artist who continues to dazzle us with new sides of herself". Victoria Segal of Q said: "There's an emotional spark here that never goes out". 

A music critic from The Wire wrote: "Rundle explores shadowy dreams and gothic fantasies through a series of precariously balanced electrified compositions that hover around her--light as a feather one minute, heavy as lead the next. On Dark Horses rides headlong into the singer's psyche as she pulls us into the darkest corners of her imagination and breathes out fevered secrets". 

A reviewer from The 405 said: "There’s no denying how incredibly dark and ominous Rundle's latest comes across, but as she slowly unearths hope, On Dark Horses offers a powerful reminder to take back control of your life, even when its crippling grasp clenches with fatal intent".

In a mixed review, Classic Rock magazine writer said, "the quiet/loud dynamic is an elegant partnership here".

Revolver ranked the album at #23 on its '30 Best Albums of 2018' list.

Track listing

Personnel 
 Emma Ruth Rundle – lyrics, vocals, guitars, flute, percussion, artwork, photography
 Evan Patterson – vocals, guitar, piano, layout
 Todd Cook – bass
 Dylan Naydon – drums, percussion
 Kevin Ratterman – mixing, mastering, producer
 Ann Gauthier – assistant engineering

Charts

References

External links 
 

2018 albums
Sargent House albums
Emma Ruth Rundle albums